Scary Kids Scaring Kids is the second studio album by American post-hardcore band Scary Kids Scaring Kids, and the last before their hiatus from 2010 to 2019. It was released on August 28, 2007 on Immortal Records and produced by Don Gilmore (who had previously worked on albums of Dashboard Confessional, Good Charlotte, Linkin Park, and Trust Company). The band specifically wanted the record to be a composed album, rather than a collection of songs thrown together. This is evidenced by transitions between songs, a prelude and an interlude, as well as references throughout the album to previous tracks on the record.

On July 4, 2007, the band posted a picture on their MySpace page saying "it begins..." , and there was much speculation as to what that may have meant. On the same day, the band released more information about the album, as well as the first single from it, "Faces", on their Myspace page. "The Deep End" was the second single released from the album on August 26, 2008. The single "Snake Devil" was released as a digital single on iTunes on October 26, 2008, and was an iTunes' "Single of the Week". The single was featured in the games SCORE International Baja 1000 and The Sims 2: Teen Style stuff pack.

The album peaked at #80 on the Billboard 200 in the US. This was the band's last album before their break-up in 2010 and the death of lead singer Tyson Stevens in 2014.

"Faces" was included on Alternative Press's "Top 46 Post-hardcore Songs from the 2000's" list.

Track listing

Personnel
Band
Tyson Stevens - lead vocals, additional guitar, lyrics, programming
James Ethridge- drums, percussion
Chad Crawford - rhythm guitar, backing vocals
DJ Wilson - bass guitar, backing vocals
Steve Kirby - lead guitar, backing vocals
Pouyan Afkary - keyboards, synthesizer, piano, programming, backing vocals

Other musicians
Justin Salter - drums (additional)

References

External links
AllMusic

2007 albums
Scary Kids Scaring Kids albums
Immortal Records albums